USS Lehigh may refer to the following ships of the United States Navy:

, was launched 17 January 1863, decommissioned 8 September 1898 and sold 14 April 1904
, was launched 25 November 1944 and decommissioned 6 November 1945

United States Navy ship names